Truancy is a compilation album that features fifteen of Pete Townshend's greatest hits. The album also features two brand new tracks: "Guantanamo" and "How Can I Help You".

Track listing

"Pure And Easy"
"Sheraton Gibson"
"(Nothing Is Everything) Let's See Action"
"My Baby Gives It Away"
"A Heart To Hang Onto"
"Keep Me Turning"
"Let My Love Open The Door"
"Rough Boys"
"The Sea Refuses No River"
"Face Dances (Part 2)"
"White City Fighting"
"Face The Face"
"I Won't Run Anymore"
"English Boy"
"You Came Back"
"Guantanamo"
"How Can I Help You"

References

2015 compilation albums
Pete Townshend compilation albums